Church of Apostle Evangelist St. Matthew in Anykščiai is a red brick Neo-Gothic church in Anykščiai, Lithuania. The Church is situated on the right bank of the Šventoji River. The twin spires of the church, each  in height, make the church the tallest in Lithuania. The brightly colored stained glass windows were the creation of Anortė Mackelaitė, the well known stained glass artist of Lithuania, between 1971 and 1986.

History

Anykščiai was first mentioned in written sources in 1442. The first church built before 1500 was a wooden structure. Following the construction of the Catholic Church, the town was mentioned as a city with Magdeburg rights in 1516. The church was destroyed by fire in 1566 and 1671, but quickly rebuilt. The decaying wooden structure was replaced by a brick church, built in 1765. An accompanying white four-storey bell tower was completed in 1823.

Following the construction of the narrow gauge railway line between Panevėžys and Švenčionėliai in the 19th century, the parish was re-developed and the church was re-built over a ten-year period between 1899 and 1909. This prompted reconstruction of the church. The spires were rebuilt, but their height was lowered by 5 metres.

There is also a legend related to the Puntukas stone, a famous stone in Lithuania. According to this legend, the devil wanted to destroy the church by dropping a heavy stone on it. However, early crowing of a rooster prevented this happening and the stone fell away from the church. It is now a visitor attraction.

Architecture

The present church building consists of twin towers, both of which are 79 metres in height. The building was built in red bricks in the Neo-Gothic architectural style. The floor plan follows the basic principles of cathedral architecture: it has two aisles and groin vaults. The church façade has stained glass windows which were installed between 1971–1986, credited to Marija Mackelaitė. Artistically decorated altars and the pulpits are seen inside the church. A statue of St Matthew is installed behind the large cross in the main altar. Inside the church, apart many elegant altars there are also statues and paintings. The church also has a large organ which was bought in 1998 from Shirley Baptist Church, Southampton. Rimas Idzelis, an amateur artist, installed Stations of the Cross on the churchyard fence in 1982–1988.  The church is surrounded by a park. In 1993 a monument was built for the Lithuanian poet and bishop Antanas Baranauskas (1835–1902), native of Anykščiai and author of the famous poem Anykščių šilelis (The Grove of Anykščiai). Sculptor Arūnas Sakalauskas and architect Ričardas Krištapavičius were awarded the Lithuanian National Prize for the monument in 1994.

Notable people
Juozapas Čepėnas (1880–1976) was pastor of Anykščiai from 1938 to 1945. During that time he protested the Holocaust and Nazi occupation of Lithuania. Monsignor Albertas Talačka (1921–1999), former pastor of Anykščiai Church, bequeathed his private library of over 4,000 books and art collection to the town and parish of Anykščiai. The art collection is on permanent displayed of Center of Sacral Art in Anykščiai.

References

External links
 Official website of Anykščiai parish 

Roman Catholic churches in Lithuania
Buildings and structures in Utena County
Tourist attractions in Utena County
Objects listed in Lithuanian Registry of Cultural Property